Disjunctive Datalog is an extension of the logic programming language Datalog that allows disjunctions in the heads of rules. This extension enables disjunctive Datalog to express several NP-hard problems that are not known to be expressable in plain Datalog. Disjunctive Datalog has been applied in the context of reasoning about ontologies in the semantic web. DLV is an implementation of disjunctive Datalog.

Syntax 

A disjunctive Datalog program is a collection of rules. A  is a clause of the form:

where , ...,  may be negated, and may include (in)equality constraints.

Semantics 

There are at least three ways to define the semantics of disjunctive Datalog:
 Minimal model semantics
 Perfect model semantics
 Disjunctive stable model semantics, which generalizes the stable model semantics

Expressivity 

Disjunctive Datalog can express several NP-complete and NP-hard problems, including the travelling salesman problem, graph coloring, maximum clique problem, and minimal vertex cover. These problems are only expressible in Datalog if the polynomial hierarchy collapses.

See also 
 Syntax and semantics of logic programming

Sources

Notes

References 
 

Logic programming languages